Ernest Wilfred Higgins (1908-1996) was an English cyclist who competed for England.

Cycling career
Higgins won a gold medal in the 1000 yards sprint at the 1934 British Empire Games in London. He rode for the Manchester Wheelers Club.

References

1908 births
1996 deaths
English male cyclists
Commonwealth Games gold medallists for England
Commonwealth Games medallists in cycling
Cyclists at the 1934 British Empire Games
Medallists at the 1934 British Empire Games